Rockwell Automation, Inc. is an American provider of industrial automation whose brands include Allen-Bradley, FactoryTalk software and LifecycleIQ Services.

Headquartered in Milwaukee, Wisconsin, Rockwell Automation employs approximately 26,000 people and has customers in more than 100 countries worldwide. The Fortune 500 company reported fiscal year 2021 global sales at $7.8 billion.

History

Early years
Rockwell Automation traces its origins to 1903 and the formation of the Compression Rheostat Company, founded by Lynde Bradley and Dr. Stanton Allen with an initial investment of $1000.

In 1904, 19-year-old Harry Bradley joined his brother in the business.

The company's first patented product was a carbon disc compression-type motor controller for industrial cranes.  The crane controller was demonstrated at the St. Louis World's Fair in 1904.

In 1909, the company was renamed the Allen-Bradley Company.

Allen-Bradley expanded rapidly during World War I in response to government-contracted work. Its product line grew to include automatic starters and switches, circuit breakers, relays and other electric equipment.

In 1914, Fred Loock established the company's first sales office in New York.

Upon co-founder Stanton Allen's death in 1916, Lynde Bradley became president. Harry Bradley was appointed vice president and attorney Louis Quarles was named corporate secretary.

During the 1920s, the company grew its miniature rheostat business to support the burgeoning radio industry. By the middle of this decade, nearly 50 percent of the company's sales were attributed to the radio department. The decade closed with record company sales of $3 million.

By 1932, at the start of the Great Depression, the company was posting record losses. It reduced its workforce from 800 to 550 and cut wages by 50 percent, replacing employees' lost wages with preferred stock, which it eventually bought back at six percent interest.

Throughout this period, Lynde Bradley supported an aggressive research and development approach intended to "develop the company out of the Depression." Lynde Bradley's R&D strategy was successful. By 1937, Allen-Bradley employment had rebounded to pre-Depression levels and company sales reached an all-time high of nearly $4 million.

Mid-late 20th century
Following the death of Lynde Bradley in 1942, Harry Bradley became company president and Fred Loock was promoted to vice president. The Lynde Bradley Foundation, a charitable trust, was established with Lynde Bradley's assets. The foundation's first gift of $12,500 was made to Milwaukee's Community Fund, a predecessor of the United Way.

World War II fueled unprecedented levels of production, with 80 percent of the company's orders being war-related. Wartime orders were centered on two broad lines of products – industrial controls to speed production and electrical components or "radio parts" used in a wide range of military equipment.

Allen-Bradley expanded its facilities numerous times during the 1940s to meet war-time production needs. With Fred Loock serving as president and Harry Bradley as chairman, the company began a major $1 million, two-year expansion project in 1947. The company completed additional expansions at its Milwaukee facilities in the 1950s and 1960s, including the Allen-Bradley clock tower. The clock tower has since been renamed and is known today as the Rockwell Automation clock tower.

Harry Bradley died in 1965. Fred Loock retired in 1967 and died in 1973.

During the 1970s, the company expanded its production facilities and markets and entered the 1980s as a global company. With president J. Tracy O'Rourke (1981–89) at the helm, the company introduced a new line of programmable logic controllers, the PLC in 1981 followed by the PLC-2 1982) (2/30, 2/05/ 2/16&2/17) PLC-3(1982) SLC-100 Family (1986) SLC-500(1986) PLC-5 Family (1985). Earlier PLC developments were the MAC, PLC-4.

In 1985 privately owned Allen-Bradley set a new fiscal record with sales of $1 billion. On February 20, 1985, Rockwell International purchased Allen-Bradley for $1.651 billion; this was the largest acquisition in Wisconsin's history to date.

The 1990s featured continued technology development, including the company's launch of its software business, Rockwell Software (1994), the Logix control platform (1997) and the Integrated Architecture system (1999). Rockwell International developed PowerFlex, a manufacturing software and technology in the 1990s.

During this decade, Rockwell International also acquired a power systems business, composed of Reliance Electric and Dodge. These two brands, combined with control systems brands Allen-Bradley and Rockwell Software, were marketed as Rockwell Automation.

In 1998, Keith Nosbusch was named president of Rockwell Automation Control Systems. Rockwell International Corporation headquarters was moved to Milwaukee, Wisconsin the same year.

21st century

In 2001, Rockwell International split into two companies.  The industrial automation division became Rockwell Automation, while the avionics division became Rockwell Collins. The split was structured so that Rockwell Automation was the legal successor of Rockwell International, while Rockwell Collins was the spin-off. Rockwell Automation retains Rockwell International's stock price history and continues to trade on the New York Stock Exchange under the symbol "ROK".

Keith Nosbusch was named chief executive officer in 2004.

In 2007, Rockwell Automation sold the Power Systems division for $1.8 billion to Baldor Electric Company to focus on its core competencies in automation and information technology.

In 2007, Rockwell Automation acquired ICS Triplex.

In April 2016, it was announced that Keith Nosbusch would be replaced by Blake Moret effective July 1, 2016. Nosbusch would remain with Rockwell Automation as chairman. Moret was previously the senior vice president of the Control Products and Solutions segment of the company.

In June 2017, Rockwell Automation and Manpower launched the Academy of Advanced Manufacturing to provide training in digital manufacturing skills for military veterans.

Effective January 1, 2018, Keith Nosbusch stepped down as Chairman. Blake Moret was elected the incoming Chairman by the board of directors.

On June 11, 2018, Rockwell Automation made a $1 billion equity investment in PTC acquiring an 8.4% ownership stake.

In February 2019, Rockwell Automation and Schlumberger entered a joint venture to create Sensia, the oil and gas industry's first fully Integrated automation solutions provider. Rockwell was later announced as a founding member of ISA Global Cybersecurity Alliance to help advance readiness and awareness in manufacturing.

Another partnership was formed in November 2019 with Accenture's Industry X.0 to help deliver greater industrial supply chain optimization. Simulation software provider ANSYS and Rockwell Automation also allied to help customers design simulation-based digital twins of products, processes, and manufacturing.

In November 2019, Rockwell Automation joined forces with Accenture, Microsoft, PTC, ANSYS, and EPLAN to help businesses simplify digital transformation. The company also announced restructuring into three operating segments, effective October 1, 2020: Intelligent Devices, Software & Control, and Lifecycle Services.

In September 2020, Rockwell Automation was recognized for its culture of supporting women by the Society of Women Engineers. During the month, PTC and Rockwell Automation announced the expansion and extension of their strategic alliance, along with a partnership with Microsoft to develop edge-to-cloud based solutions for connecting information between development, operations, and maintenance teams.

In November 2020, the company announced announces plans to achieve a new net zero carbon neutral goal (Scopes 1 and 2) by 2030.

Rockwell Automation hired its first Chief Diversity, Equity, and Inclusion Officer in February 2021. On February 23, Rockwell was recognized by Ethisphere as one of the 2021 World's Most Ethical Companies, marking the 13th time the company received this honor. The company would later add another executive role with Chief Sustainability Officer in 2021.

April 2020 saw robot manufacturer Comau and Rockwell Automation partner to simplify robot integration for industries.

Another partnership came with Cisco in May 2021 to combat rapidly evolving industrial cybersecurity threats by adding Cisco's Cyber Vision to the LifecycleIQ Service portfolio.

September 2021 Rockwell Automation and Ansys announce partnership for enhanced Studio 5000 Simulation Interface to connect with Ansys digital twins.

On November 9, 2021, the company celebrated the opening of its 30th annual Automation Fair in Houston.

In 2022, Rockwell Automation announced new partnerships with cybersecurity services leaders Dragos and CrowdStrike. The company also established a new Cybersecurity Operations Center in Israel.

Business operations 
Rockwell Automation is a global company focusing on industrial automation and digital transformation. In 2021, Rockwell Automation adjusted its organizational structure into three operating segments—Intelligent Devices, Software & Control, and Lifecycle Services.

Rockwell Automation has three primary areas of business operations:

Allen-Bradley—automated components and integrated control systems for safety, sensing, industrial control, power control and motion control.

FactoryTalk—software that supports advanced industrial applications including system design, operations, plant maintenance, and analytics.

LifecycleIQ Services—services to help connect, secure, mobilize, and scale manufacturing operations.

Acquisitions 
In recent years, Rockwell Automation has grown through acquisitions of companies specializing in software services for supply chain management, systems integrators, cloud-native smart manufacturing platforms, simulation capabilities, manufacturing execution systems, and cybersecurity services.

2019 
MESTECH Services – Provider of Manufacturing Execution Systems (MES)/Manufacturing Operations Management (MOM), digital solutions consulting, and systems integration services.

Emulate3D – Software developer for simulating and emulating industrial automation systems.

2020 
Fiix – Provider of artificial intelligence-enabled computerized maintenance management systems.

Oylo – Provider of industrial control system (ICS) cybersecurity services including assessments, turnkey implementations, managed services, and incident response.

Kalypso – Software delivery and consulting firm specializing in digital transformation for industrial companies.

ASEM – Provider of digital automation technologies including industrial PCs, HMI software and hardware, remote access and secure industrial IoT gateway solutions.

Avnet – Provider of IT/OT cybersecurity services and solutions including assessments, penetration testing, network & security solutions, and training for converged IT/OT managed services.

2021 
AVATA – Services provider for supply chain management, enterprise resource planning, and company performance management.

Plex Systems – Cloud-native smart manufacturing platform operating at scale, including advanced Manufacturing Execution Systems (MES), quality and supply chain management capabilities.

2023 

Knowledgelens – KnowledgeLens is a services and solutions provider that delivers actionable business insights from enterprise data, combining digital technologies with deep data science, artificial intelligence (AI), and engineering expertise.

Notable distinctions 
In 2020 it was named to the Newsweek America's Most Responsible Companies list.

In 2021 Rockwell was named to the FTSE4Good Index Series for the 20th time. The Index is designed to measure the performance of companies demonstrating strong Environmental, Social, and Governance (ESG) practices.

Also, in 2021 the company was listed on the Dow Jones Sustainability Indices for the 11th time. The pioneering series of global sustainability benchmarks is composed of global, regional, and country leaders annually assessed on long-term governance and economic, environmental, and social criteria.

In 2021 Rockwell was named to Barron's 100 Most Sustainable Companies list and ranked among the top five companies in the Leading Climate Aligned Companies category.

See also
Allen-Bradley
Allen-Bradley Clock Tower
Engineer In Training (EIT) Program
Retro-Encabulator, fictional Rockwell Automation device

References

External links
Rockwell Automation

Companies listed on the New York Stock Exchange
Technology companies established in 1903
Manufacturers of industrial automation
Manufacturing companies based in Milwaukee
MES software
1903 establishments in Wisconsin
Electric motor manufacturers